Little Tony is a 1998 Dutch comedy film drama directed by Alex van Warmerdam. It was screened in the Un Certain Regard section at the 1998 Cannes Film Festival.

In a review for Variety, David Rooney called the film "[a] droll comedy", but also mentioning that its "both blacker and more tightly focused".

Plot
Farmer Brand can't read and he is quite happy with that. His wife, Keet, who has to read him all the subtitles on the television, isn't. She decides to hire a teacher for him. This is a beautiful young woman, called Lena. Brand falls in love with her. To his puzzlement and dismay Keet encourages him, because as she says she doesn't want a husband with another woman in his head. She even goes so far as to claim, she's just Brand's sister. She also wants Lena to give Brand and her a son. The love between Brand and Lena does not grow stale as Keet hoped after the birth of little Tony. Keet, who is a barren herself decides Lena has to be eliminated with the arrival of little Tony between them.

Cast
Alex van Warmerdam	as Brand
Annet Malherbe	as Keet
Ariane Schluter as Lena
Sebastiaan te Wierik as Kleine Teun
Aat Ceelen	as Butcher
Beppe Costa as Verger
Joeri Keyzers as Baby
Rick Keyzers as Baby
Maike Meijer as Young Mother
Thomas Rap	as Man at strawheap
Hanneke Riemer	as Friend of Lena
Dolf Sauter as Priest
Tomas te Wierk as Teun
Houk van Warmerdam as Acolyte
Marc van Warmerdam as Neighbour
Mees van Warmerdam	as Acolyte

References

External links

1998 comedy-drama films
Films directed by Alex van Warmerdam
Dutch comedy-drama films
1990s Dutch-language films